The Austin and Northwestern Railroad Historic District-Fairland to Llano is a  historic district in Burnet County and Llano County, Texas, United States.  It was listed on the National Register of Historic Places in 1997.  The listing included four contributing buildings, 43 contributing structures, and three contributing sites.

It is located near Kingsland, Texas and runs roughly along railroad tracks from Fairland to Llano. It also was known as Southern Pacific Railroad—Fairland to Llano branch.

The historic district is generally a linear  strip along the railroad with a  width of the right-of-way for the tracks. The three exceptions to this are the Fairland wye, the Antlers Hotel in Kingsland and the original depot in Llano, Texas.

See also
 Austin and Northwestern Railroad

References

Historic districts on the National Register of Historic Places in Texas
National Register of Historic Places in Burnet County, Texas
National Register of Historic Places in Llano County, Texas
Buildings and structures completed in 1891
Hotels in Texas